Pedro Jiménez Galán (April 14, 1920 – March 3, 2021) was a Spanish politician. He was a deputy in the Constituent Cortes from 1977 to 1979.

References

Spanish centenarians
Men centenarians
Spanish Socialist Workers' Party politicians
1920 births
2021 deaths